Bình Trị Thiên (1975–1990) was a former administrative grouping of three provinces in Vietnam: Quảng Bình, Quảng Trị and Thừa Thiên. The grouping did not work well and was reversed in 1992. The geographical term had been used previously, for example in relation to culture, folk songs (1967) and is still used after, for example in relation to dialect (1997) and folk songs again (1997).

Geography 

Binh Tri Thien province has the geographical location:

 The North borders on the province Nghệ Tinh
 The South borders on the province Quang Nam - Da Nang
 East sea bordering the east
 The West borders Laos.

History 

In 1976, these three provinces were merged by the Government Republic of South Vietnam into a province with a provincial capital based in the city Hue.  According to Decision on June 30, 1989 of the VIII National Assembly, the 5th session, these three provinces were split again, but after the split, Thua Thien province had a new name: Thua Thien - Hue.

When unified, Binh Tri Thien province initially had 23 administrative units including:  Hue city (provincial capital), 2 towns Dong Ha, Dong Hoi and 20 districts: A Luoi, Bo Trach, Cam Lo, Gio Linh, Hai Lang, Huong Hoa, Huong Thuy, Huong Tra, Le Thuy, Minh Hoa, South East,  Phong Dien, Phu Loc, Phu Vang, Quang Dien,  Quang Ninh, Quang Trach, Trieu Phong,  Tuyen Hoa, Vinh Linh.

According to Decision No. 62-CP of the Government Council Vietnam Democratic Republic dated March 11 year 1977, the districts were merged and the changes were as follows:

 Merge two districts Phu Loc, Nam Dong and 2 communes: Vinh Xuan, Vinh Thanh of the district Phu Vang into a new district of Phu Loc
 Merge two districts of Phu Vang (except for 2 communes: Vinh Xuan, Vinh Thanh) and Huong Thuy into a district Huong Phu
 Merge the three districts  Phong Dien, Quang Dien, Huong Tra into the district Huong Dien
 Merge the two districts Trieu Phong, Hai Lang into the district  Trieu Hai
 Merge the two districts Le Thuy,  Quang Ninh into districts Le Ninh
 Merging three districts Vinh Linh, Gio Linh, Cam Lo into district  Ben Hai
 Consolidate the two districts Minh Hoa, Tuyen Hoa (except for 9 communes: Van Hoa, Phu Hoa, Canh Hoa, Tien Hoa, Mai Hoa, Chau Hoa, Ngu Hoa, Cao Hoa and Quang Hoa)  to become a new district of Tuyen Hoa
 Merging 9 communes: Culture, Phu Hoa, Canh Hoa, Tien Hoa, Mai Hoa, Chau Hoa, Ngu Hoa, Cao Hoa and Quang Hoa of Tuyen Hoa district into the district Quang Trach
 Merging Huong Lap commune of Vinh Linh district into the district Huong Hoa.

Since then, Binh Tri Thien province has the capital city of Hue, 2 towns: Dong Ha, Dong Hoi and 11 districts: A Luoi,  Ben Hai, Bo Trach, Huong Dien, Huong Hoa, Huong Phu, Le Ninh, Phu Loc, Quang Trach,  Trieu Hai, Tuyen Hoa.

On June 30 year 1989, the 5th session of the VIIIth National Assembly issued a resolution to divide Binh Tri Thien province to re-establish Quang Binh, Quang Tri and Thua Thien - Hue provinces:

 Quang Binh province includes  Dong Hoi town and 4 districts: Bo Trach, Le Ninh, Quang Trach, Tuyen Chemistry.
 Quang Tri province has  Dong Ha town and 3 districts:  Ben Hai, Huong Hoa,  Trieu Hai.
 Thua Thien - Hue province has Hue city and 4 districts: A Luoi, Huong Dien, Huong Phu, Phu Loc.

Provincial People's Committee Chairman through the periods 

 Nguyen Hua
 Bui San (1977-1981)
  Vu Thang (1981-1985)
 Nguyen Van Luong (1985-1989).

Songs about Binh Tri Thien 

  Binh Tri Thien smoke and fire  by Nguyen Van Thuong.

References 

Former provinces of Vietnam